Ram Jagannath Joshi (also known as Ram Joshi) (1762-1812) was a Marathi poet, known for his works in Lavani, Powada, and Tamasha genre.

In Popular Culture
 Lokshahir Ram Joshi, a 1947 Marathi Film

References

1762 births
1812 deaths
Indian poets